Poland's 44th Senate district is one of 100 Polish Senate districts which elect one member of the Senate using first-past-the-post voting. It is currently represented by Kazimierz Ujazdowski of the Civic Platform.

The district was created in 2011 when the Polish Senate moved from multi-member constituencies to single-member constituencies.

District profile 
The district encompasses four districts of Warsaw: Żoliborz, Białołęka, Bielany and Śródmieście.

Members of Senate

Election Results

  | style="background-color: Red" |
  | OdP
  | Katarzyna Pawlak
  | align="right"|60,076
  | align="right"|15.8
  | align="right"|-
  |-

| style="background-color: " |
  | PO (KO)
  | Kazimierz Ujazdowski
  | align="right"|308,627
  | align="right"|55.3
  | align="right"|+11.8

References

44
Politics of Warsaw